Thomas Clinton Blake (July 19, 1927 – September 29, 2020) was an American football tackle who played for the New York Bulldogs. He played college football at the University of Cincinnati, having previously attended Middletown High School in Ohio. He was inducted into the University of Cincinnati Athletic Hall of Fame in 1998.

References

1927 births
2020 deaths
American football tackles
Cincinnati Bearcats football players
Tennessee Volunteers football players
New York Bulldogs players
Players of American football from Illinois
People from Coles County, Illinois